Nola is a town and municipality in Italy; and NOLA is an acronym for New Orleans, Louisiana, a city in the USA.

Nola or NOLA may also refer to:

Places 
 Nola, Central African Republic, a city in Sangha-Mbaéré
 Nola, Arkansas, United States, an unincorporated community
 Roman Catholic Diocese of Nola, Italy
 NOLA Motorsports Park, a road race track in Avondale, Louisiana

People
 Nola (name), a list of people (and a rhinoceros) with the given name or surname

Fictional characters
 Nola Darling, the central character in the film She's Gotta Have It
 Nola Rice, main character in the film Match Point

Battles 
 Battle of Nola (disambiguation)
 Battle of Nola (Second Punic War): -- Battle of Nola (216 BC),  Battle of Nola (215 BC), Battle of Nola (214 BC), all inconclusive attempts by Hannibal to seize the town of Nola during the Second Punic War

Arts and entertainment 
 WNOL-TV, a CW affiliate for New Orleans known on air as NOLA 38
 Nola (film), a 2003 film starring Emmy Rossum

Music 
 Nola (music group), a Croatian rock band
 NOLA (album), the debut album from sludge metal act Down
 "Nola", a 1915 novelty piano solo composed by Felix Arndt

Biology
 Nola (rhinoceros), a female northern white rhinoceros at the San Diego Zoo
 Nola (moth), the namesake genus of the moth family Nolidae

Other uses 
 The open source predecessor to the accounting software NolaPro

See also